Nathan Ross (born 14 December 1976 in Australia) is an Australian born former Scotland 'A' international rugby union player. He played at Lock.

Ross qualifies for Scotland as his grandfather was born in Dunfermline. He was capped by Scotland A against Romania in 2001, confirming his Scottish nationality. He was called up for the full Senior squad in 2001 for a training session by Ian McGeechan but not used in a full match.

Ross signed for Glasgow Warriors in 2001. He gave up a banking job in Brisbane to sign for the Warriors.

He signed for Exeter Chiefs in 2005.

References

External links
ESPN biography

1976 births
Living people
Scottish rugby union players
Glasgow Warriors players
Australian rugby union players
Scotland 'A' international rugby union players
Rugby union locks